Tranquillo Orsi (1771–1845) was an Italian painter, scenographer, and architect, who is known for his engravings and drawings of buildings. He also was a stage set designer for the Teatro La Fenice.

Biography
He was born and died in Venice. He was appointed professor of perspective at the Academy of Fine Arts of Venice, a post at which he was replaced by Federico Moja.

References

18th-century Italian painters
18th-century Italian architects
19th-century Italian painters
19th-century Italian architects
Italian scenic designers
Italian male painters
Painters from Venice
Academic staff of the Accademia di Belle Arti di Venezia
1771 births
1845 deaths
19th-century Italian male artists
18th-century Italian male artists